Nikola Kosteski (born 22 August 1992) is a Macedonian handball player who plays for Talent Plzeň.

His brother Nenad Kosteski is also a handball player.

References
http://www.eurohandball.com/ec/cl/men/2015-16/player/542289/NikolaKosteski

1992 births
Living people
Macedonian male handball players
Sportspeople from Struga
Mediterranean Games competitors for North Macedonia
Competitors at the 2018 Mediterranean Games